Csaba Szücs (born 28 July 1987 in Košice) is a Slovakian handball player, belonging to the Hungarian minority.
He currently plays for Bergischer HC and the Slovakian national team.

References

External links 
 Csaba Szücs at TV Großwallstadt (German)
 

1987 births
Living people
Sportspeople from Košice
Hungarians in Slovakia
Slovak male handball players
Expatriate handball players
Slovak expatriate sportspeople in Germany
Bergischer HC players